The Abubakar Tafawa Balewa University, library was established in August 1981 to provide information on various discipline.

History 

The Abubakar Tafawa Balewa University Library was established in August 1981 with the main objectives to provide strong supports  for both teaching /learning process and research.  As a citadel of learning, the Library provides Student populace, Lecturers and research Scholars free and timely access to the most current information and publications in various subject disciplines / field of study.    

In order to achieve her vision, the Library developed strategies and articulate collection development policy that ensure balanced collection development programmes.  Therefore the collection development committee on, which all academic programmes are presented, ensures that the users participate actively in collection development. While Library has representative Librarian on all Board of Studies of the Faculties to ensure that the Library has firsthand knowledge of curriculum changes in order to develop collection that are responsive and relatable to the needs of all academic programmes of the University.     

As supportive unit, ATBU library introduced GNS 201 Information Science. This course is recommended for all students in the second year and taught by the library academic staff.  The main objective is to enable them locate materials for their study and equip the students with the ability to manipulate library resources for whatever needed usage.       

The library is already hooked to the internet which has also been networked with its software (called Adlib) for its day to day operation.  The digital centre has 25 computers available to the users and it dual purpose. The  library has access to internet service and is also a gateway to other databases across the globe.  Apart from subscription, there was also free access to some designated websites. There is also access to a good number of resources such as HINARI, AGTORA and ESBCO HOST among others.

Structure 
The library is made up of the librarian office, Technical services with the reader's service division been the largest. There is E-library within the main library, other courses and programmes also have their library within the premises of the institution.

The Administration is made up of the University Librarian Office, the Secretary and Administrative Officers as well as service staff.  The Collection Development Division consists of Acquisition, Cataloguing, Classification and Indexing as well as the Serial Sections. Readers’ Services Division on the other hand is the largest with Circulation, Reference, Photocopy, Reserve and Documents Sections. While the Technical Service Division is responsible for reprography, binding and maintenance of the library materials.   

There is a visual library within the library’s computer unit.  The various Colleges (faculties) and some programmes (departments) run their own libraries and in addition to the central university library.

Collections 
Abubakar Tafawa Balewa University, library is big enough to contain about 1000 reader's from all over the world. It has 161,672 book volumes, 3442 journal titles and 2,117 serial titles according to their website, which was last updated in 2017.

See also 
Abubakar Tafawa Balewa University
List of libraries in Nigeria
University of Ibadan

References

External links
ATBU Library

Academic libraries in Nigeria
Abubakar Tafawa Balewa University